In metadata, the term data element is an atomic unit of data that has precise meaning or precise semantics. A data element has:
 An identification such as a data element name
 A clear data element definition
 One or more representation terms
 Optional enumerated values Code (metadata)
 A list of synonyms to data elements in other metadata registries Synonym ring

Data elements usage can be discovered by inspection of software applications or application data files through a process of manual or automated Application Discovery and Understanding. Once data elements are discovered they can be registered in a metadata registry.

In telecommunication, the term data element has the following components:

A named unit of data that, in some contexts, is considered indivisible and in other contexts may consist of data items.
A named identifier of each of the entities and their attributes that are represented in a database.
A basic unit of information built on standard structures having a unique meaning and distinct units or values.
In electronic record-keeping, a combination of characters or bytes referring to one separate item of information, such as name, address, or age.

In the areas of databases and data systems more generally a data element is a concept forming part of a data model. As an element of data representation, a collection of data elements forms a data structure.

In practice 

In practice, data elements (fields, columns, attributes, etc.) are sometimes "overloaded", meaning a given data element will have multiple potential meanings. While a known bad practice, overloading is nevertheless a very real factor or barrier to understanding what a system is doing.

See also
 Application Discovery and Understanding
 Data element definition
 Data dictionary
 Data hierarchy
 ISO/IEC 11179 metadata registry specification
 Metadata
 Representation term
 Universal Data Element Framework
 Data collection system

References

External links 
 Association for Enterprise Integration
 Federal XML Developer's Guide
 ISO/IEC 11179 Standards (see ISO/IEC 11179-3:2003 clause 3.3.36)

Metadata
Enterprise application integration